David Keith Ballow (1804–1850) was the Government Medical Officer in Brisbane, Queensland, Australia and the first doctor to establish a private practice in Brisbane.

Early life
David Keith Ballow was born in October 1804 at Montrose, Scotland, the eldest son of John Ballow. He studied at the University of Edinburgh.

Medical career in Sydney
He immigrated to Sydney in 1834. On 21 October 1837 in Sydney, he married Catherine Campbell, the youngest daughter of Captain D. McArthur, of the 2nd Royal Veteran Battalion. In December 1837, Dr Ballow was appointed Assistant Colonial Surgeon in Sydney.

Medical career in Brisbane

In March 1838, he was placed in charge of the Government Hospital in Brisbane. Ballow and his wife arrived in Brisbane  as it transitioned from being a penal colony to a free settlement. He later become the Resident Surgeon of the Moreton Bay General Hospital.  He was also the coroner for the Brisbane district and the visiting surgeon of the gaol.

On 8 August 1850 the immigrant ship Emigrant arrived in Moreton Bay with typhus on board. The ship was quarantined at Dunwich on Stradbroke Island away from Brisbane. Forty people on the ship died, including the ship's surgeon Dr George Mitchell. Initially Dr Mallon came from Brisbane to care for the quarantined patients 
at Dunwich but he too contracted the infection. Dr Ballow took his place and also contracted the
disease. Dr Kearsey Cannan took charge after Dr Ballow's death. He put his tent on Bird Island, visiting his patients as required from there and managed to avoid catching the disease.

While Dr Mallon recovered, Dr Ballow died at Dunwich on 29 September 1850.

Memorials
Dr Ballow was buried in the Dunwich Cemetery; the cemetery has a memorial stone for Dr Ballow and the other victims of typhus. Ballow Road at Dunwich is believed to be named after him. A white marble memorial tablet was also placed in St John's Cathedral in Brisbane. The heritage-listed Ballow Chambers building of medical suites is named after him and the building has a plaque about Dr Ballow.

References

External links
 

19th-century Australian medical doctors
1804 births
1850 deaths
History of Brisbane
People from Montrose, Angus